Captain Khan is a 2018 Bangladeshi action thriller film directed by Wazed Ali Sumon and written by Delowar Hossain Dil. The film was produced by Selim Khan and the production house was Shapla Media. Shakib Khan, Shabnom Bubly, Samraat, Misha Sawdagor and  Ashish Vidyarthi in the lead roles. The film is an unofficial remake of the 2014 Tamil language film Anjaan. The film had a nationwide theatrical release on Eid-ul-Adha 2018.

Plot 
A disabled man, Asif (Shakib Khan), arrives in town. He, along with a taxi driver, travel around Dhaka to look for his elder brother, Captain Khan. The taxi driver tries to get to know about Asif but is unable to get any details from him. Asif rents a hotel room, takes a shower, and changes his dress.

Asif starts the mission to find his brother, Captain Khan. He realizes that his brother has been harmed by some dangerous people, who then try to kill Asif, when they understand that he has come for the Captain. Then starts a mystery with much action.

Cast 
 Shakib Khan as Captain Khan/Asif
 Shabnom Bubly as Riya/Muskan
 Samraat as Joy
 Misha Sawdagor as Ibrahim
 Amit Hasan as R.K
 Don as Tony
 Shiba Shanu as Abbas
 Neel
 Sadek Bachchu as Jamal
 Ashish Vidyarthi as Abdur Rahman, police commissioner
 Subrata as Inspector Afzal
 Kamol Patekar 
 Boby
 Zohir
 Payel Mukherji
 Sumit Ganguly
 DJ Shohel
 Alka
 Parthasarathi Chakraborty as Cocktail Khan, a taxi driver
 Jadu Azad

Soundtrack

References

External links 
 

2010s Bengali-language films
Bengali-language Bangladeshi films
2018 action thriller films
Bangladeshi action thriller films
2018 films
Bangladeshi remakes of Indian films
Bangladeshi films about revenge
Films directed by Wajed Ali Sumon
Shapla Media films